Willie Mays and the Say-Hey Kid is a 1972 American traditional animated comedy film produced by Rankin/Bass Productions. The special aired on October 14, 1972 as part of The ABC Saturday Superstar Movie.

Plot

A guardian angel agrees to help Willie Mays win the National League Pennant, if Mays agrees to take care of Veronica, a lonely, mischievous orphan girl. Veronica makes Mays' life difficult, but when relatives show up to claim her after hearing that she's inherited money, Mays' heart softens.

Cast
 Willie Mays as Himself
 Tina Andrews as Veronica
 Paul Frees as Iguana
 Ernestine Wade as Veronica's aunt

Crew
 Produced and Directed by Arthur Rankin, Jr. and Jules Bass
 Teleplay by Romeo Muller
 Associate Producer: Basil Cox
 Music: Maury Laws
 Editorial Supervision: Irwin Goldress
 Sound Engineers: Jim Harris and John Boyd
 Animation Supervision: Toru Hara

See also
 List of films about angels

References

External links
 

1972 animated films
1972 films
1972 television films
1972 television specials
1970s American animated films
1970s American television specials
1970s animated television specials
American sports comedy films
1970s sports comedy films
The ABC Saturday Superstar Movie
American baseball films
Animated films about orphans
Films scored by Maury Laws
Films about angels
Television shows directed by Arthur Rankin Jr.
Television shows directed by Jules Bass
Rankin/Bass Productions television specials
Animation based on real people
Cultural depictions of baseball players
Black people in art
Television shows written by Romeo Muller
1972 comedy films
1970s English-language films